Gary Gregory Gach (born 1947) is an American author, translator, editor, and teacher living in San Francisco.  His work has been translated into several languages, and has appeared in several anthologies and numerous periodicals. He has hosted Zen Mindfulness Fellowship weekly for 12 years, and he swims in the San Francisco Bay.

Life

Gach was born in a Jewish American family in Hollywood, Los Angeles in 1947. He was student body president of John Burroughs Junior High School.  He claims to have had a mystic vision as a young boy. At 11, he read The Way of Zen by Alan Watts, beginning a lifelong interest in Buddhism.

He was formally introduced to meditation by Paul Reps and later studied Hasidic Judaism and Kabbalah, and was introduced to shikantaza by Dainin Katagiri Roshi, then Suzuki Roshi.  Alan Watts befriended and encouraged.  He took transmission in the Plum Village Tradition, and is lay ordained in its core community the Order of Interbeing/

He has worked as an actor, stevedore, typographer, legal secretary, editor-in-chief, webmaster, and teacher. He currently teaches Zen Buddhism at University of San Francisco where he also hosts the weekly Zen Mindfulness Fellowship.

Bibliography

Author
 1974: Preparing the Ground : Poems 1960-1970 (Heirs, International; San Francisco)
 1996: The Pocket Guide to the Internet: No-Sweat Guide to the Information Highway (Pocket Books; New York) 
 1997: Writers.net: Every Writer's Essential Guide to Online Resources and Opportunities (Prima Publishing; Rocklin, New York)  
 2001–2009: Complete Idiot's Guide to Understanding Buddhism  (Alpha Books, New York) ; 2nd edition, 2004 - ; 3rd edition, 2009 - .
 2018: Pause Breathe Smile – Awakening Mindfulness When Meditation Is Not Enough (Sounds True, Colorado)

Translator
 2005: (Co-translator with Brother Anthony (Taizé Community) and Kim Young-moo) Ten Thousand Lives by Ko Un, introduction by Robert Hass, (Green Integer: Los Angeles)   
 2006: (Co-translator  with Brother Anthony  and Kim Young-moo) Flowers of a Moment, 185 brief poems by Ko Un; (BOA Editions, Ltd.: Rochester, New York) 
 2007: (Co-translator  with Brother Anthony Of Taizé and Kim Young-moo) Songs for Tomorrow: Poems 1961-2001 by Ko Un (Green Integer: Los Angeles) 
2023: (Co-translator with Erfan Mojib) Hafiz's Little Book of Life – Gardens of the World, Wine, Wisdom, & Ecstasy (Hampton Roads | Red Wheel / Weiser: Newburyport MA)

Editor
 1998: What Book!? : Buddha Poems from Beat to Hiphop, introduction by Peter Coyote (Parallax Press; Albany, California)   (American Book Award)

Awards
Gach is a recipient of an American Book Award (from the Before Columbus Foundation) in 1999 for What Book!?
Shortlisted for Northern California Book Award for Translation, for Songs for Tomorrow and finalist for Flowers of a Moment (Lannan Translations Selection). Nautilus Book Awards for Complete Idiot's Guide to Buddhism 3rd ed'n.

References

External links
 Author page 
 Gach's personal home page  
 Teachings of the Buddha – interview by Marjorie Chiew, The Star (Malaysia), (December 12, 2010)
 Interview with Gach at Writers Write (August 1997)
 Materials on file at Internet Archive.

American Buddhists
20th-century American poets
20th-century American Jews
Jewish poets
Buddhism in the United States
English-language haiku poets
Living people
Buddhist writers
1947 births
20th-century American translators
American male poets
American Book Award winners
20th-century American male writers
21st-century American Jews